Lyman W. Emmons (March 5, 1885 – March 9, 1955) was an American politician and businessman.

Biography
Emmons was born on a farm in Lawrence County, Illinois and went to the public school in Lawrence County. Emmons attended Vincennes University in Vincennes, Indiana and to Central Normal College in Danville, Illinois. Emmons taught school in Lawrence County. In 107, Emmons graduated from Barnes School of Anatomy, Sanitary Science and Embalming in Chicago, Illinois. He was the owner of a funeral home in Lawrenceville, Illinois. Emmond served on the Lawrenceville Board of Education and was president of the board of education. He also served as President of the Lawrenceville Library Board. Emmons served in the Illinois House of Representatives from 1921 to 1925 and the Illinois Senate from 1925 to 1929. He was a Democrat. Emmons and a friend were killed by a train north of Pinkstaff, Illinois.

References

External links

1885 births
1955 deaths
People from Lawrenceville, Illinois
Vincennes University alumni
American funeral directors
Businesspeople from Illinois
Educators from Illinois
School board members in Illinois
Democratic Party members of the Illinois House of Representatives
Democratic Party Illinois state senators
Road incident deaths in Illinois
20th-century American politicians
20th-century American businesspeople